is the third vessel of the s of the Japan Maritime Self-Defense Force (JMSDF).

Design
The hull design is generally based on the one of the Murasame class. However, as a part of weapons was changed, the internal structure has also been changed. And it was said that the large lattice mast was degrading its stealthiness in the Murasame class, so in this class, it was considered to change to two small masts, but it was not implemented.

Although its displacement become slightly increased, there is no change in its main engines, as it is not a big difference that has little effect on the performance of the ship.

Construction and career 
Makinami was authorized under the Medium-term Defense Buildup Plan of 1996, and was built by IHI Marine United shipyards in Yokohama. She was laid down on 17 July 2001, launched on 8 August 2002. She was commissioned into service on 18 March 2004. and was initially assigned to the JMSDF Escort Flotilla 2 based at Sasebo.

Makinami, along with the fleet oiler Towada were assigned to the Indian Ocean in November 2006 to provide assistance in refueling anti-terrorist coalition forces in Afghanistan as part of Operation Enduring Freedom. She returned to Japan in March 2007.

In November 2010, Makinami, along with the destroyer , was dispatched to Aden, Yemen to participate in anti-piracy escort operations off the coast of Somalia.  The destroyer was part of the sixth rotation of JMSDF vessels patrolling in this region. She undertook 28 sorties, returning to Japan on 11 January 2011. On 15 March 2011, she was reassigned to the JMSDF Escort Flotilla 3, based at Ōminato in Aomori Prefecture.

On 13 August 2012 Makinami was dispatched to Aden again, together with the destroyer , to resume anti-piracy escort operations off the coast of Somalia. The context for this extended deployment off the Horn of Africa was the "Law on the Penalization of Acts of Piracy and Measures Against Acts of Piracy (Anti-Piracy Measures Law)".    Approximately 2,000 merchant ships with ties to Japan, Japan-flagged or operated by Japanese firms pass through the busy shipping zone each year.

Makinami returned to Yokosuka on 11 February 2013 and remains assigned to the Third Squadron of the JMSDF Escort Flotilla 3. In October 2013, Makinami participated in the International Fleet Review 2013 in Sydney, Australia.

In July 2021, it participated in the Pacific Vanguard 2021 (PACVAN) joint exercise off the coast of Australia.

On 21 May 2022, Makinami, and the replenishment oiler,  trailed the PLAN  carrier strike group going towards Miyako-jima.

Notes

References

 
Saunders, Stephen. IHS Jane's Fighting Ships 2013-2014. Jane's Information Group (2003). 

2002 ships
Takanami-class destroyers
Ships built by IHI Corporation